Chelsea Elizabeth Islan (born 2 June 1995) is an Indonesian actress, model, and activist. She has received two consecutive Citra Award nominations in the Best Actress category for Di Balik 98 (2015) and Rudy Habibie (2016).

Islan rose to fame for her role in the popular sitcom Tetangga Masa Gitu which aired from 2014 to 2017 alongside Sophia Latjuba, Deva Mahenra, and Dwi Sasono. She won four consecutive Indonesian Choice Awards for Actress of the Year from 2015 until 2018, the last year the award show was held.

Early life
Chelsea Islan was born in Queens, New York City, to an American mother and an Indonesian father, Islan moved to Jakarta to start elementary school and stay until she finished high school at the Mentari International School. As an elementary student, she appeared in a stage play of Once on This Island.

Career 
She made her feature film debut in the 2013 drama film Refrain alongside Afgansyah Reza and Maudy Ayunda before achieving mainstream success with the action film Street Society and the biographical film Merry Riana: Mimpi Sejuta Dolar as well as the sitcom Tetangga Masa Gitu in 2014.

Before this, in 2005, she had starring Wall's ice cream commercial.

She appeared opposite Boy William in the historical drama Di Balik 98 in 2015 and another biographical drama Rudy Habibie in 2016. Both roles garnered Islan consecutive nominations at the 2015 and 2016 Citra Awards in the Best Actress category, which she lost to Tara Basro (A Copy of My Mind) and Cut Mini (Athirah) respectively.

For her role in the 2016 biopic film 3 Srikandi, Islan won the 2016 Maya Award for Best Supporting Actress, the 2017 Indonesian Movie Award for Favorite Supporting Actress, as well as a Best Actress Award at the 2016 Bandung Film Festival. Also in 2016, she appeared as a doctor in the Mo Brothers' action film Headshot.

She was cast in the lead role of Alfie for Timo Tjahjanto's solo directorial debut May the Devil Take You, which was released in 2018 to critical and commercial success. She reprised the role in the 2020 sequel May the Devil Take You Too and is set to appear in the third installment May the Devil Take You: Dajjal.

Islan has appeared in multiple commercials for brands such as L'Oreal, Garnier, Tokopedia, Pizza Hut, Oppo, Magnum, Rexona, and Matahari Department Store.

Personal life
Islan established 'Youth of Indonesia', a youth community dedicated to be a platform to contribute to Indonesia and protect the values of pluralism, on the 88th anniversary of the 1928 Youth Pledge on 28 October 2016. She also serves as president of the community She was named an Innovative Young Leader at the 2017 Southeast Asian Leaders Summit in Jakarta.

Filmography

Film

Television

Music video

Awards and nominations

Magazine and Tabloids 
 Tabloid Wanita Indonesia March 2016, August 2016
 Majalah Femina 13–19 August 2016 (with Bunga Citra Lestari & Tara Basro)

References

External links 
 
 
 

1995 births
Actresses from New York City
American people of Indonesian descent
Indo people
Indonesian activists
Indonesian women activists
Indonesian actresses
Indonesian Roman Catholics
Indonesian female models
Living people
Maya Award winners
21st-century American women